Griveaudia  is a genus of moths of the family Callidulidae.

Species
Griveaudia atkinsoni Moore, 1879
Griveaudia charlesi Viette, 1968
Griveaudia discothyrata Poujade, 1895
Griveaudia nigropuncta Leech, 1898
Griveaudia nigropuncta Viette, 1958
Griveaudia tractiaria Oberthür, 1893
Griveaudia vieui Viette, 1958

References

Callidulidae